Masili station is a railway station located on the South Main Line in Laguna, Philippines. It is a flag stop for the line as there are no platforms yet being erected, temporary stairs for the trains are added in the meantime to facilitate loading and unloading.

History 
Masili was built due to a petition of the residents of the then barangay Sumile to the Manila Railroad Company demanding for a station of their own on its Main Line South going to Legaspi. The company then erected a flag stop shelter in fulfillment of the resident's wishes.

The station was named as such because of a misspelling on the station board after the stop was built. Surprisingly, no one bothered to correct the mistake and the barangay was now referred to its current name as a consequence.

Present 
In December 2019, the station was used once again as PNR extended the Metro South Commuter trips by adding 5 more stations on the present commuter line, which terminates on IRRI station in Los Baños. KiHa 59 series and KiHa 35 trainsets ply the route, with the former servicing the entire route to Tutuban and the latter going up to Alabang only. Services become disrupted again as soon as the lockdown caused by the COVID-19 Pandemic takes effect mid-March 2020. As of November 2021, the service is still inactive.

References 

 

Philippine National Railways stations